Tylopilus hongoi is a bolete fungus in the family Boletaceae found in Japan, where it grows in coniferous forest under fir, spruce, and birch. It is named after mycologist Tsuguo Hongo.

References

External links

hongoi
Fungi described in 1993
Fungi of Japan